Cronquistianthus leucophyllus is a species of flowering plant in the family Asteraceae.

It is native to Ecuador and Peru.

References

leucophyllus
Flora of Ecuador
Flora of Peru